Stroitel may refer to:

Places
Stroitel Urban Settlement, a municipal formation which the town of Stroitel and three rural localities in Yakovlevsky District of Belgorod Oblast, Russia are incorporated as
Stroitel (inhabited locality), several inhabited localities in Russia

Sports
Stroitel Stadium (Soligorsk), a multi-purpose stadium in Salihorsk, Belarus
FC Stroitel Morshansk, a soccer club based in Morshansk, Russia
FC Stroitel Pripyat, a soccer club based in Pripyat, Ukraine
FC Stroitel Vitebsk, a soccer club based in Vitebsk, Belarus
Stroitel Syktyvkar, a bandy club based in Syktyvkar, Russia
FC Stroitel Cherepovets, name of FC Bulat Cherepovets, a former soccer club based in Cherepovets, Russia, in 1979–1988
FC Stroitel Kurgan, name of FC Tobol Kurgan, a soccer club based in Kurgan, Russia, in 1960–1964
FC Stroitel Saransk, name of FC Mordovia Saransk, a soccer club based in Saransk, Russia, in 1961
FC Stroitel Starye Dorogi, name of FC Starye Dorogi, a soccer club based in Staryya Darohi, Belarus, in 1987–2000
FC Stroitel Temirtau, name of FC Bolat, a soccer club based in Temirtau, Kazakhstan, in 1969–1977
FC Stroitel Tyumen, former name of FC Tyumen, a soccer club based in Tyumen, Russia
FC Stroitel Ufa, name of FC Neftyanik Ufa, a soccer club based in Ufa, Russia, in 1959–1976, 1997, and 1999–2003
FC Stroitel Vladikavkaz, name of FC Spartak Vladikavkaz, a former soccer club based in Vladikavkaz, Russia, in 1992
Stroitel Karagandy, name of Avtomobilist Karagandy, an ice hockey club based in Karaganda, Kazakhstan, in 1993–1995
Stroitel Temirtau, name of Bulat Temirtau, a former ice hockey club based in Temirtau, Kazakhstan, in 1960–1990
Stroitel, former name of Lesokhimik, a bandy club in Ust-Ilimsk, Russia
Stroitel, nickname of BC Budivelnyk, a basketball club based in Kyiv, Ukraine